Mushketov Glacier refers to glaciers named after I. V. Mushketov:
 Mushketov Glacier (Antarctica), in Queen Maud Land. Antarctica
 Mushketov Glacier (Severnaya Zemlya) in Bolshevik Island, Severnaya Zemlya
 a valley glacier in the central Tian Shan